Brigadier Maurice "Bunny" Austin,  (15 December 1916 – 13 October 1985) was an Australian Army officer. He served in the Second Australian Imperial Force in the Second World War, commanded the 2nd Battalion, Royal Australian Regiment in 1952, and led the 1st Battalion, Royal Australian Regiment in the Korean War in 1952–53. 

His appointments included Commandant of the Jungle Training Centre; Commander of the Logistic Support Force; Director of Personnel Services and honorary ADC to the Governor General.

On retirement from the army he was appointed the Australian Army Historian where he researched and published works on the history of the army in Australia from 1788 to federation.

The nickname "Bunny" comes from the fact that Thomas Austin (no relation) is believed to have been the first person to introduce rabbits in Australia.

In 1940, Austin married Enid Veronica Lyons, the daughter of Prime Minister Joseph Lyons and Dame Enid Lyons.

See also
 List of Australian Army brigadiers

References
 World War II Nominal Roll
 The Army in Australia 1840–50 (M. Austin), Australian Government Publishing Service, 1979. .

External links
 Maurice "Bunny" Austin honours and awards page at Australian War Memorial
 Australian War Memorial: PR86/062 – Papers of Maurice "Bunny" Austin
 Austin, Maurice (Bunny) (1916–1985), by A. J. Hill, Australian Dictionary of Biography

1916 births
1985 deaths
Military personnel from Victoria (Australia)
Australian brigadiers
Australian Companions of the Distinguished Service Order
Australian military personnel of the Korean War
Australian Army personnel of World War II
Australian Officers of the Order of the British Empire
People from Geelong